The 1924 Utah Utes football team was an American football team that represented the University of Utah as a member of the Rocky Mountain Conference (RMC) during the 1924 college football season. Led by Thomas M. Fitzpatrick in his sixth and final season as head coach, the Utes compiled an overall of record of 3–4–1 with a mark of 2–2–1 in conference play, tying for sixth place in the RMC.

Prior to the 1924 season, Fitzpatrick announced his intention to retire and pursue other business opportunities, but he agreed to coach through the end of the 1924 season. Utah opened the season at home on October 4 against Drake, their first opponent from east of the Rocky Mountains. Ike Armstrong, and assistant coach for Drake, expressed interest in the head coaching position at Utah and was hired. He coached the Utes for 25 season and had a record of 141–55–15.

Schedule

References

Utah
Utah Utes football seasons
Utah Utes football